Chen Chih-yuan  (born October 27, 1976 in Taoyuan County, Taiwan) is a Taiwanese aborigine (tribe: Amis) former professional baseball player (position: outfielder).

Career
A well-known slugger since college era in the Fu Jen Catholic University, Chen had been a frequent member of the Chinese Taipei national baseball team between 1997 and 2004, participating the 2004 Summer Olympics in which he hit a home run in the match against Greece. In professional career, Chen joined the Brother Elephants of CPBL in mid-2001 and had been a bright star of the team.

After the 2009 CPBL season Chen had been under investigation for game-fixing allegations. Although Chen denied any wrongdoings, the Banqiao District Prosecutors' Office still indicted him for gambling and fraud on February 10, 2010. Chen was immediately expelled as a result, ending his professional baseball career.

Since December 2010, Chen runs a barbecue restaurant in Hualien City along with his former Brother Elephants teammate Chin-hui Tsao who was also expelled by CPBL due to game-fixing allegation. In June 2011, the Banciao District Court sentenced Chen to 30 months imprisonment for game-fixing. An appeal heard by the Taiwan High Court in 2014 reduced his prison sentence to four to six months, or a fine of NT$162,000.

Chen married local starlet Lin Hsiu-Chin in 2005 and they had a daughter.

Career statistics
Bold font indicates leading in CPBL

Awards
6-time CPBL All-star Game (2002–2006, 2008)
CPBL Rookie of the Year (2001)
CPBL RBI Champion Award (2003)
CPBL Hits Champion Award (2003)
3-time CPBL Golden Glove Award (outfielder) (2002–2004)
3-time CPBL Best Ten Player Award (outfielder) (2002–2004)

Salary

See also
 Chinese Professional Baseball League
 Brother Elephants

References

External links

 

1976 births
Living people
Amis people
Asian Games bronze medalists for Chinese Taipei
Asian Games medalists in baseball
Asian Games silver medalists for Chinese Taipei
Baseball outfielders
Baseball players at the 1998 Asian Games
Baseball players at the 2002 Asian Games
Baseball players at the 2004 Summer Olympics
Baseball players from Taoyuan City
Brother Elephants players
Fu Jen Catholic University alumni
Medalists at the 1998 Asian Games
Medalists at the 2002 Asian Games
Olympic baseball players of Taiwan
Match fixers
Taiwanese criminals
Sportspeople convicted of crimes